German folklore is the folk tradition which has developed in Germany over a number of centuries. Partially it can be also found in Austria.

Characteristics 
It shares many characteristics with Nordic folklore and English folklore due to their origins in a common Germanic mythology. It reflects a similar mix of influences: a pre-Christian pantheon and other beings equivalent to those of Norse mythology; magical characters (sometimes recognizably pre-Christian) associated with Christian festivals, and various regional 'character' stories.

As in Scandinavia, when belief in the old gods disappeared, remnants of the mythos persisted: Holda, a "supernatural" patron of spinning; the Lorelei, a dangerous Rhine siren derived from 19th-century literature; the spirit Berchta (also known as Perchta); the Weiße Frauen, a water spirit said to protect children; the Doppelgänger, supernatural beings said to resemble the exactly similar appearance of determined person; the Wild Hunt (in German folklore preceded by an old man, Honest Eckart, who warns others of its approach); the giant Rübezahl; changeling legends; and many more generic entities such as the elf, dwarf, kobold and erlking.

Popular folklore includes Krampus and Knecht Ruprecht, a rough companion to Santa Claus; the Lutzelfrau, a Yule witch who must be appeased with small presents; the Osterhase (Easter Hare – the original Easter Bunny); and Walpurgisnacht, a spring festival derived from pagan customs.

Character folklore includes the stories of the Pied Piper of Hamelin, the Godfather Death, the trickster hero Till Eulenspiegel, the Town Musicians of Bremen and Faust.

History 
Documentation and preservation of folklore in the states that formally united as Germany in 1871 was initially fostered in the 18th and 19th centuries. As early as 1851, author Bernhard Baader published a collection of folklore research obtained by oral history, called Volkssagen aus dem Lande Baden und den angrenzenden Gegenden. The Saxon author Johann Karl August Musäus was another early collector.

Study was further promoted by the Prussian poet and philosopher Johann Gottfried von Herder. His belief in the role of folklore in ethnic nationalism – a folklore of Germany as a nation rather than of disunited German-speaking peoples – inspired the Brothers Grimm, Goethe and others. For instance, folklore elements, such as the Rhine Maidens and the Grimms' The Story of a Boy Who Went Forth to Learn Fear, formed part of the source material for Richard Wagner's opera cycle Der Ring des Nibelungen.

Some of the works of Washington Irving – notably "Rip van Winkle" and "The Legend of Sleepy Hollow" – are based on German folktales.

Within Germany, the nationalistic aspect was further emphasized during the National Socialist era. Folklore studies, Volkskunde, were co-opted as a political tool, to seek out traditional customs to support the idea of historical continuity with a Germanic culture. Anti-Semitic folklore such as the blood libel legend was also emphasized.

See also 
Continental Germanic mythology
German Legends

References

External links 
Johann Karl August Musäus Projekt Gutenberg DE (in German)
German Fairy Tales and Folklore Collected by Fairytales (in English)